Concordia University Press is a university press associated with Concordia University, located in Montreal, Canada. Founded in 2016, the press issues books in both English and French. Concordia University Press is a member of the Association of Canadian University Presses and the Association of Canadian Publishers, and an affiliate of the Association of University Presses.

See also

 List of English-language book publishing companies
 List of university presses

References

External links 
Concordia University Press

Concordia University Press
University presses of Canada